Yohimbine, also known as quebrachine, is an indole alkaloid derived from the bark of the African tree Pausinystalia johimbe; also from the bark of the unrelated South American tree Aspidosperma quebracho-blanco. Yohimbine is an α2-adrenergic receptor antagonist, and has been used in a variety of research projects. It is a veterinary drug used to reverse sedation in dogs and deer.

While yohimbine behaves as an aphrodisiac in some mammals, it does not do so in humans. It has been prescribed as a treatment for erectile dysfunction, although its reported clinical benefits were modest and it has largely been superseded by the PDE5 inhibitor class of drugs. Substances that have purported to be extracts from the yohimbe tree have been marketed as dietary supplements for various purposes, but they contain highly variable amounts of yohimbine, if any; no published scientific evidence supports their efficacy.

Uses
Yohimbine is a drug used in veterinary medicine to reverse the effects of xylazine in dogs and deer. It is used as a research reagent. In the US, it is prescribed, but now rarely, for erectile dysfunction in men.

Yohimbine and yohimbe

Confusion
Yohimbine should not be confused with yohimbe but often is.

Yohimbe is the common English name for the tree species P. johimbe (also called Corynanthe johimbe)
and, by extension, the name of a medicinal preparation made from the bark of that tree, sold as an aphrodisiac. In contrast, yohimbine is a pure alkaloid that can be isolated from yohimbe bark.

Yohimbine is just one of at least 55 indole alkaloids that have been isolated from the bark; and, while it has been described as the most active of these, it constitutes only 15% of the total alkaloid content. Others include rauwolscine, corynanthine and ajmalicine; the bark also contains non-alkaloids about which virtually nothing is known.

Yohimbe, thus a complex mixture, has been studied far less thoroughly than yohimbine, the pure compound. Pharmaceutical grade yohimbine is usually presented as the hydrochloride, which is more soluble.

Effect on sexual function

History, research and literature
Yohimbe is used in folk medicine as an aphrodisiac. In 1900, it attracted scientific interest in Germany, where an initial report claimed that yohimbe exerted a strong aphrodisiacal effect in animals and humans. Attention soon shifted from the plant to its active constituents, particularly yohimbine. According to a 2010 encyclopedia article by Joseph M. Betz of the National Institutes of Health:

 In contrast, there is a "fairly rich literature on yohimbine".

Subsequent work on yohimbine, while confirming that it behaves as an aphrodisiac in animals, including rats, dogs and golden hamsters, has failed to do so in humans. According to Betz:

Clinical efficacy
Yohimbine has been used to treat female sexual dysfunction, but there are few reported clinical trials and these do not show it to be better than placebo. On treatment for male erectile dysfunction (ED), a review article by Tam et al. (2001) concluded:

Again according to Betz (2010),

A 2011 review by Andersson said:

Yohimbine has been largely superseded by the PDE5 inhibitor drugs such as sildenafil (Viagra). Prescriptions for it are now rare, and most US pharmaceutical manufacturers have discontinued production of prescription capsules and tablets.

Yohimbine has been found to be effective in treating delayed ejaculation in men

Yohimbine and dietary supplements

In the US, "yohimbe" preparations are sold as a dietary supplements for enhancing libido, for weight loss and as aids for bodybuilding; but "There is virtually no published research on yohimbe which supports these or any other claims". Often, these products explicitly claim to contain yohimbine.

Cohen et al. found that samples of brands sold in American brick-and-mortar stores contained highly variable amounts of yohimbine, and sometimes none at all. Labelling claims were often misleading. Similar results have been reported by other laboratories for products sold in the U.S., in other countries and on the internet. One study found that many brands of "yohimbe" might not derive from the P. johimbe tree in the first place. According to yet another source, the yohimbe sold in markets in West Africa, where the tree grows, is frequently adulterated with other species of the genus Pausinystalia; these contain little yohimbine. The amounts of alkaloid found even in genuine P. johimbe bark vary considerably, depending on the source of the bark (roots, stem, branches, height, etc.).

Some brands sold over-the-counter were found to contain more yohimbine per serving than a standard pharmaceutical dose; yet, in the US, pharmaceuticals are subject to the strict regulatory regime pertaining to medicines. It is illegal to introduce or deliver "drugs" into interstate commerce without the permission of the FDA. The FDA has asserted that some yohimbine-containing products are "drugs" because they are so promoted as to show "they are intended for use in the cure, mitigation, treatment or prevention of disease": 21 U.S.C. § 321(g)(1)(B). However the legal position is not entirely straightforward, and as of 1 February 2019 there does not appear to be any record of a successful prosecution.

Because of the lack of reliable scientific data on yohimbe, the European Food Safety Authority Panel on Food Additives determined that it was not possible to conclude on its safety or to establish a health-based guidance value. They wrote:

Extracts and chemistry
Yohimbe (Pausinystalia johimbe) is a tree that grows in western and central Africa; yohimbine was named as originally extracted from the bark of yohimbe in 1896 by Adolph Spiegel (but see § Aspidosperma quebracho-blanco below). In 1943 the correct constitution of yohimbine was proposed by Witkop. Fifteen years later, a team led by Eugene van Tamelen used a 23-step synthesis to become the first persons to achieve the synthesis of yohimbine.

Pharmacology 
Yohimbine has high affinity for the α2-adrenergic receptor, moderate affinity for the α1 receptor, 5-HT1A, 5-HT1B, 5-HT1D, 5-HT1F, 5-HT2B, and dopamine D2 receptors, and weak affinity for the 5-HT1E, 5-HT2A, 5-HT5A, 5-HT7, and dopamine D3 receptors. It behaves as an antagonist at α1-adrenergic, α2-adrenergic, 5-HT1B, 5-HT1D, 5-HT2A, 5-HT2B, and dopamine D2, and as a partial agonist at 5-HT1A. Yohimbine interacts with serotonin and dopamine receptors in high concentrations.

Research

Yohimbine has been studied as a way to improve the effects of exposure therapy in people with post traumatic stress disorder (PTSD), which passed a phase 2 study in 2017.

It has also been studied as a potential treatment for erectile dysfunction but there is insufficient evidence to rate its effectiveness. It is illegal in the United States to market an over the counter product containing yohimbine as a treatment for erectile dysfunction without getting FDA approval to do so. Nevertheless, the quantity of yohimbine in dietary supplements, often advertised as promoting sexual function, has been found to overlap with prescription doses of yohimbine.

Yohimbine blocks the pre- and post-synaptic α2 receptors. Blockade of post-synaptic α2 receptors causes only minor corpus cavernosum smooth muscle relaxation, due to the fact that the majority of adrenoceptors in the corpus cavernosum are of the α1 type. Blockade of pre-synaptic α2 receptors facilitates the release of several neurotransmitters in the central and peripheral nervous system — thus in the corpus cavernosum — such as nitric oxide and norepinephrine. Whereas nitric oxide released in the corpus cavernosum is the major vasodilator contributing to the erectile process, norepinephrine is the major vasoconstrictor through stimulation of α1 receptors on the corpus cavernosum smooth muscle. Under physiologic conditions, however, nitric oxide attenuates norepinephrine vasoconstriction.

Botanical sources of yohimbine; sustainability

Pausinystalia johimbe
The traditional source of yohimbine is the bark of the African tree P. johimbe. It has other uses, but the tree is sought out primarily for its bark; in practice, harvesting the bark kills the tree. Tree density is relatively low (average ≈ 4 harvestable trees/hectare). The high demand for medicines based on the bark has led to the tree's over-exploitation. The bark is traded in local markets and, because it is scarce, it is often adulterated with that of other species which contain little yohimbine. The species is becoming endangered.

Around the year 2000, Cameroon was shipping P. johimbe to Europe at the rate of about 100 tonnes annually. Most bark is collected illegally by local people who are paid 150 CFA francs per kilo (about US$0.10 per pound) for delivery of pre-dried bark at the roadside. In practice they confuse and mix it with P. macroceras ("false yohimbe"), a species that contains little yohimbine.

Aspidosperma quebracho-blanco
Aspidosperma quebracho-blanco is an unrelated tree whose common name is quebracho blanco. It is found in large areas of central South America, particularly the Gran Chaco, where it is often the dominant species in the canopy. It is one of the most widely distributed Argentine arboreal species. Traditionally it was logged for fuel, timber and railway sleepers. While in recent times cattle ranching and soya cultivation have led to considerable habitat loss, and while there is still illegal logging, no shortage of the bark is reported. The tree has not been described as endangered: a few members of the genus Aspidosperma are on the IUCN Red List. but the quebracho blanco species is not one of them.

In its bark an alkaloid is found which was given the name Quebrachine. In 1914, two scientific papers claimed quebrachine was chemically identical to yohimbine. This was disputed, and the matter long remained in doubt. However, in 1972, Effler and Effler using modern analytical techniques, including mass spectrometry, UV absorption, IR absorption, and NMR, established that quebrachine and yohimbine are one and the same thing. They wrote: 

A range of secondary reference works give 'quebrachine' as a synonym for yohimbine.

Strictly speaking, wrote George Barger, yohimbine should have been given the scientific name quebrachine, seeing that it was first isolated from the quebracho tree and first named in the scientific literature. However the later work on P. yohimbe was better known, so the newer name stuck.

Other plants
Yohimbine has also been isolated from other plant genera in the family Apocynaceae including Lochnera (Catharanthus), Rauvolfia, Amsonia, Vallesia and Vinca; from the family Loganiaceae (genera Gelsemium and Strychnos); and from the family Euphorbiaceae (genus Alchornea).

Doping 
There was a case in the World Anti-Doping Agency practice in 2007, when an athlete, who reportedly consumed Yohimbine prior to a given athletic event, was later tested positive for 19-norandrosterone, which is a prohibited substance. However, WADA did not yet list Yohimbine (which can come into a body via an energy drink, also in a form of pre-workout supplement or fat burner) as a prohibited substance, nor did it confirm that its use can increase the endogenous level of anabolic steroids, in particular of 19-norandrostenedione and testosterone.

See also 
 Ajmalicine
 Alstonine
 Corynanthine
 Deserpidine
 Mitragynine
 Rauwolscine
 Spegatrine
 Reserpine
 Rescinnamine

References

External links 
 

Alkaloids found in Euphorbiaceae
Alkaloids found in Rauvolfia
Alpha-1 blockers
Alpha-2 blockers
Anxiogenics
Entheogens
Tryptamine alkaloids
Quinolizidine alkaloids
Indoloquinolizines
Norepinephrine releasing agents
Stimulants
Sympathomimetics
Vasoconstrictors
Vasodilators